is a Japanese manga series by Mimana Orimoto. The series began serialization in Akita Shoten's seinen manga magazine Young Champion Retsu from February 2011 and has been collected in fifteen tankōbon volumes as of 20 January 2022. An anime television series adaptation by TMS Entertainment/8Pan aired between April and June 2016.

Plot
Taking an interest, Hane joins her school's motorcycle club and gets a motorcycle license. After buying her own bike, Hane begins her exciting, two-wheeled, motorized high-school life along her new friends; Onsa Amano, Rin Suzunoki, Raimu Kawazaki and Hijiri Minowa.

Characters

Bike club

The friendly, kind-hearted main protagonist, who rides a pink-colored Honda CB400SF Hyper VTEC Spec III.

A blonde and busty girl who wears her hairs in pigtails and is an avid fan of Suzuki motorcycles, to the point that she gets angry when someone belittles any of their models, no matter how weird they look, and has troubles riding bikes from any other company. She rides a Suzuki GSX400S Katana which belonged to her father. Despite not being an official member of the club, Rin always accompanies the others with their activities nonetheless. Rin works part-time as a pizza delivery person.

A wild-hearted, tomboyish girl whose family runs a bike shop. She rides a Yamaha SEROW225W put together with parts from two other broken bikes.

A wealthy girl in glasses who dreams of becoming a rebel and delinquent, but her kind nature usually leads her to do otherwise. Prior to turning sixteen and becoming old enough to ride a bike, she rides in a sidecar alongside her butler, Hayakawa. After turning sixteen, she obtains a moped license and rides a Honda Super Cub outfitted with a cattle skull and training wheels, until she properly learns to ride and switches to a customized Ducati 1199 Panigale S, tuned down to attend the Japanese regulations that ban minors from riding bikes with displacements bigger than 400 cc.

Always wearing a helmet, Raimu never talks and her face is never shown, in a fashion similar to The Stig. She acts as the big sister figure of the group, but in reality, Raimu is actually a seasoned biker who is on the school for at least 20 years (her actual age is unknown but the principal calls her "Raimu-senpai") and has re-enrolled using a false 18-year-old student ID at the school principal's request to keep an eye on the members when they decided to reform the motorcycle club, which was disbanded twenty years ago after a serious accident involving Raimu during a race. Her surname is actually unknown, as she uses a false one on her ID taken from her bike, a Kawasaki Ninja ZX-12R.

The newest member of the club, Chisame is a prodigy with racing motorcycles, but has a serious height complex due to her petite figure. She rides a Honda NSF100 in races and her father's Honda PCX 150 scooter in streets, under her belief that bikes are not meant for roads.

Other characters

Hane's younger sister, who seems to be more responsible and level-headed than her.

 A butler who serves the Minowa family.  Hayakawa rides a Ducati 750SS Imola Replica with a sidecar that Hijiri rides in prior to obtaining her license.

The Principal of Okanoue Girls High School and an old friend of Raimu, who is older than her. She later buys herself a BMW K1300R.

Onsa's father who runs a used bike shop that runs some shift business, much to Onsa's dismay.

Rin's father who is always seen wearing a helmet. Like Rin, he is also a Suzuki fan, but not as passionately as her. He used to ride the same Suzuki GSX400S Katana that now belongs to Rin, and now owns a Suzuki 1135R Katana Yoshimura that his daughter won for him on an essay contest. He has the tendency to be reckless and ends up getting into accidents frequently.

Chisame's father, he is a famous moto GP racer, also known as the "Handsome racer" and based on Shinya Nakano. He rides a Honda CBR1000RR.

Chisame's mother, she was a member of the motorcycle club 20 years before and used to hang out with Tazuko and Raimu.

The motorcycle club's adviser who has bad luck with men. She also has the habit of attacking other girls (including her students) when drunk and rides a 50cc bike.

A Honda CB400SF training motorcycle Hane piloted during her license examination and somehow could communicate with her, giving her hints. Baita talks with a feminine voice as she claims that she was emasculated due to being tuned down for training use only. After Hane got her license, Baita was retired, but satisfied that Hane was the 1000th student that lost her "virginity" with her. Hane's friendship with Baita is what inspired her choice of personal bike.

Media

Manga
Two spin-off manga were announced in the May 2018 issue of Young Champion Retsu. The first spin-off titled Bakuon!! - Amano Onsa no Nikoichi Hanjōki (Bakuon!! - A Record of Onsa Amano's Thriving Jury Rigging), centers on the character Onsa Amano and began serialization in Akita Shoten's Champion Cross website on April 17, 2018. The second spin-off titled Bakuon!! - Suzunoki Rin no Yabō (Bakuon!! - Rin Suzunoki's Ambition), centers on the character Rin Suzunoki and will begin serialization in Akita Shoten's Champion RED magazine on May 19. A third spin-off manga titled Bakuon!! Taiwan-hen began serialization in Akita Shoten's Bessatsu Young Champion magazine on November 5, 2019.

Anime
An anime television series adaptation by TMS Entertainment aired in Japan between April 5, 2016 and June 21, 2016 and was simulcasted by Crunchyroll. The series was directed by Junji Nishimura with scripts written by Kurasumi Sunayama and music composed by Ryosuke Nakanishi. An original video animation was bundled with the seventh manga volume on March 18, 2016. A second original video animation was bundled with the ninth manga volume on December 20, 2016. Sentai Filmworks acquired the license for the North American rights and released the series on DVD and Blu-ray in August 2017. Universal Pictures originally announced that they would release the series in the UK, however, it was later announced that MVM Entertainment will be releasing the series.

Episode list

Reception

Previews
Anime News Network had five editors review the first episode of the anime: Nick Creamer was positive towards the comedic content having solid visual and verbal jokes being delivered through humorous character expressions and voice acting; Theron Martin was initially entertained by the amusing cast and intricate motorbike knowledge but was distracted by the fanservice involving the girls' figures; Rebecca Silverman praised Onsa Amano for her "delightfully retro [character] design" and flighty yet endearing personality, and the surprisingly funny sex humor being delivered by Baita but found both Sakura and Rin to be unbearable and lacking interesting qualities to them; Lynzee Loveridge was also positive towards Onsa and the driver's ed bike providing decent comedy but felt the rest of the episode had an unspectacular cast, generic character designs (outside of Onsa's) and dull non-motorbike humor, saying the anime will appeal more to that specific subset of gearheads than a general audience. The fifth reviewer, Jacob Hope Chapman, found the series to be more of an "Akamatsu-style 90s harem comedy than K-On! on motorcycles", criticizing the humorless jokes, overbearing and screechy female characters, and lackluster production for delivering "garish flat designs" and lazily repeated animation, concluding that: "Bakuon!! has that unique kind of lameness where it feels like it's not really made for any audience in 2016. If you were hoping for moe motorcycles, there's no innocent charm to be found here, and if you just want to see some fanservice, you'll probably want to hold out for a show with better drawings."

Series reception
Stig Høgset at THEM Anime Reviews was critical of the "cartoonish caricatures" and the last episode being disappointing with its signature humor being replaced with a flat joke but gave praise to the main cast for their charm and personalities being closer to real-life, quality animation to accentuate the motorbiking scenes and use of the gag comedy format to tell its stories (highlighting the Hokkaido arc), calling it "[A]n energetic, if flawed, show that nevertheless has its heart where it counts."

References

External links
Anime official website 

Akita Shoten manga
Animated television series about auto racing
Motorsports in anime and manga
NBCUniversal Entertainment Japan
School life in anime and manga
Seinen manga
Sentai Filmworks
TMS Entertainment